Epitausa is a genus of moths in the family Erebidae. The genus was erected by Francis Walker in 1857.

Species
Epitausa adelpha (Felder & Rogenhofer, 1874) Argentina
Epitausa atriplaga (Walker, 1858) Brazil (Amazonas), Panama
Epitausa coppryi (Guenée, 1852) Brazil (Amazonas), French Guiana
Epitausa dilina (Herrich-Schäffer, [1858]) Brazil (Amazonas)
Epitausa ferogia (Schaus, 1906) Brazil (São Paulo)
Epitausa flagrans (Walker, 1869) Suriname
Epitausa hermesia (Schaus, 1906) Brazil (São Paulo)
Epitausa laetabilis Walker, [1857] Dominican Republic
Epitausa livescens (Guenée, 1852) French Guiana
Epitausa lurida (Butler, 1879) Brazil (Amazonas)
Epitausa megastigma (Herrich-Schäffer, [1854]) Suriname
Epitausa modesta (Schaus, 1914) Suriname
Epitausa obliterans (Walker, 1858) Brazil (Amazonas)
Epitausa octophora (Felder & Rogenhofer, 1874) Brazil (Amazonas)
Epitausa olivescens (Schaus, 1912) French Guiana
Epitausa pallescens (Schaus, 1901) Brazil (São Paulo)
Epitausa patagonica (Guenée, 1852) Patagonia
Epitausa pavescens (Butler, 1879) Brazil (Amazonas)
Epitausa perserverans (Walker, 1858) Brazil (Amazonas, Para)
Epitausa phanerosema (Hampson, 1926) Brazil
Epitausa prona (Möschler, 1880) Panama, Suriname
Epitausa rubripuncta (Guenée, 1852) Brazil (Amazonas), French Guiana
Epitausa subinsulsa (Dognin, 1912) French Guiana
Epitausa sublata (Dognin, 1912) Peru
Epitausa terranea (Schaus, 1911) Costa Rica
Epitausa venefica (Möschler, 1880) Suriname
Epitausa violascens (Hampson, 1926) Brazil (Amazonas)

References

Eulepidotinae
Moth genera